Maccus mac Arailt (fl. 971–974), or Maccus Haraldsson, was a tenth-century King of the Isles. Although his parentage is uncertain, surviving evidence suggests that he was the son of Harald Sigtryggson, also known as Aralt mac Sitriuc, the Hiberno-Norse King of Limerick. Maccus' family is known as the Meic Arailt kindred. He and his brother, Gofraid, are first recorded in the 970s. It was during this decade and the next that they conducted military operations against the Welsh of Anglesey, apparently taking advantage of dynastic strife within the Kingdom of Gwynedd.

The Meic Arailt violence during this period could account for Maccus' participation in a royal assembly convened by Edgar, King of the English. Maccus may have been regarded as a potential threat by not only the English and Welsh kings, but also the rulers of the Kingdom of Strathclyde. Perhaps as a consequence of this convention, the Meic Arailt thereafter turned their attention to Ireland. In 974, Maccus defeated and captured Ímar, King of Limerick. Gofraid resumed the family's campaigning against the Welsh before the end of the decade. In 984, the Meic Arailt appear to have formed an alliance with the family of Brian mac Cennétig, King of Munster. Whether Maccus was alive by this date is unknown. He does not appear on record after this date, and seems to have been succeeded by his brother. Gofraid is the first King of the Isles to be identified as such by Irish sources.

Family

Maccus was a member of the Meic Arailt kindred, although his exact parentage is uncertain. Surviving evidence suggests that Maccus' father was probably Aralt mac Sitriuc, King of Limerick. Such a relationship would mean that Maccus was a member of the Uí Ímair. Alternate possibilities—lacking specific evidence—are that Maccus was a son of Hagrold, a Danish warlord active in Normandy; or a son of Haraldr Gormsson, King of Denmark.

Maccus appears to have been an elder brother of Gofraid mac Arailt. A sister of Maccus and Gofraid, or perhaps a daughter of the latter, may have been Máel Muire, wife of Gilla Pátraic mac Donnchada, King of Osraige. Specific evidence of a familial relationship between Máel Muire and the Meic Arailt may be preserved by the twelfth-century Banshenchas, a source that identifies the mother of Gilla Pátraic's son, Donnchad, as Máel Muire, daughter of a certain Aralt mac Gofraid. One possibility is that this source has erroneously reversed the patronym of Maccus' brother. Another brother of Maccus may have been Eiríkr Haraldsson, a Viking who ruled the Kingdom of Northumbria in the mid part of the tenth century. Although non-contemporary Scandinavian sources identify this figure with the like-named Norwegian royal Eiríkr blóðøx, there is reason to suspect that these sources have erroneously conflated two different individuals, and that the former was a member of the insular Uí Ímair.

There is uncertainty surrounding Maccus' name. Besides this mistranscription, Maccus is not accorded the name  by any historical source, and his name is unlikely to refer to it. Maccus' name may instead be of Gaelic origin.

Irruption into the Irish Sea region

The Meic Arailt first appear on record in the Irish Sea in the 970s. The power of the family seems to have been centred in the Isles,  and may have been based upon control of the important trade routes through the Irish Sea region. If the Meic Arailt were indeed centred in the Hebrides, the family's apparent ambition to secure control of Mann could account for its campaigning against the Welsh on Anglesey. The latter island was the traditional seat of the kings of Gwynedd, and control of it may have been sought by the Meic Arailt as a way to further ensure the control of the surrounding sea-lanes.

According to the "B" version of the eleventh- to thirteenth-century Annales Cambriæ, an unidentified son of Aralt wasted this island off the north-west Welsh coast. The thirteenth- and fourteenth-century texts Brut y Tywysogyon and Brenhinedd y Saesson corroborate this record and identify the attacker as Maccus himself. Maccus' assault targeted Penmon on the eastern coast of the island. Several near-contemporary engraved crosses at Penmon indicate that it was a significant ecclesiastical site with important patrons. Both Brut y Tywysogyon and Brenhinedd y Saesson further reveal that Gofraid attacked Anglesey the next year, and thereby brought the island under his control. At the time of the Meic Arailt kindred's attacks, the Kingdom of Gwynedd was in the midst of a vicious civil war triggered by the death of Rhodri ab Idwal Foel, King of Gwynedd in 969, a fact which could indicate that the Meic Arailt purposely sought to capitalise on this infighting.

Amongst an assembly of kings

There is evidence indicating that Maccus was amongst the assembled kings who are recorded to have met with Edgar, King of the English at Chester in 973. According to the "D", "E", and "F" versions of the Anglo-Saxon Chronicle, after having been consecrated king that year, this English monarch assembled a massive naval force and met with six kings at Chester. By the tenth century, the number of kings who met with him was alleged to have been eight, as evidenced by the tenth-century Life of St Swithun. By the twelfth century, the eight kings began to be named and were alleged to have rowed Edgar down the River Dee, as evidenced by sources such as the twelfth-century texts Chronicon ex chronicis, Gesta regum Anglorum, and De primo Saxonum adventu, as well as the thirteenth-century Chronica majora, and both the Wendover and Paris versions of Flores historiarum.

The titles associated with Maccus appear to relate to a similar one— ("king of many islands")—earlier accorded to Amlaíb mac Gofraid, King of Dublin by Chronicon ex chronicis.

The precise reasons for Edgar's assembly are uncertain. It came on the heels of a royal crowning ceremony at Bath, and could have been orchestrated as a way to project imperial authority over Edgar's neighbours. With a grand show of force, Edgar may have sought to demonstrate this authority, and thereby resolve certain outstanding issues with his neighbouring rulers. There is reason to suspect that the upsurge in Viking activity in the 960s/970s, and the emergence of the Meic Arailt in the region, may have factored in Edgar's machinations. Specifically, one aspect of the assembly may have concerned the ongoing warring between the Meic Arailt and the Welsh. Such conflict could have posed a significant threat to the English trade routes in the region, and Edgar may have sought an understanding with Maccus to ensure the safety of important sea-lanes shared with the Islesmen. The threat of international collusion could have also factored into Edgar's assembly. One possibility is that he may have acted to ensure that the Islesmen would not be tempted to lend support to discontented elements in the English Danelaw. It is also conceivable that the assembly could have concerned the remarkable rising power of Amlaíb Cúarán in Ireland. Edgar may have moved to resolve the strife between the Meic Arailt and the Welsh as a way to limit the prospect of any encroachment by Amlaíb Cúarán into the Irish Sea region. This reigning King of Dublin was a leading member of the Uí Ímair, and may have been a rival to the Meic Arailt. By easing tensions between the Meic Arailt and the Welsh, Edgar could have sought to gain their allegiance against Amlaíb Cúarán's ambitions of authority in the area, and further offset any attempt by Amlaíb Cúarán to attain an alliance with the Scots and Cumbrians against the English.

The fact that Brenhinedd y Saesson reports that Gofraid subdued Anglesey and placed it under tribute could indicate that the Meic Arailt were attempting to establish themselves in Britain, and could indicate that the Meic Arailt participated in the assembly in this context. If Maccus was in possession of Mann in the 970s the record of Edgar's assembled fleet could have been a response to the perceived threat that Maccus posed. As such, the episode could well be an example of tenth-century gunboat diplomacy. Other royal attendees of the summit meeting appear to have been Dyfnwal ab Owain, and Dyfnwal's son Máel Coluim, men who represented the Cumbrian Kingdom of Strathclyde. It is probable that the power of the Meic Arailt posed a serious threat to the rulers of this northern British realm, and may explain their own part in the assembly. One possible result of the conference is that Edgar recognised Maccus' lordship in the Isles in return for his acceptance of English overlordship. Although Maccus appears as a witness in two alleged royal charters of Edgar, these appear to be forgeries.

Later career

Whatever the reasons behind the assembly, the Meic Arailt violence in the region was temporarily abated—perhaps as a consequence of the conference—and the kindred turned its attention westwards towards Ireland.

If Maccus was indeed a son of Aralt, Maccus' move against Ímar in 974 would appear to corroborate this kinship. For instance, Maccus' attack could have been undertaken in the context of regaining what he regarded as his patrimony, since Ímar's accession in Limerick was conceivably accomplished at the expense of Aralt's progeny.

It is possible that Ímar was in control of Limerick in 969, and may have controlled the town in 972, when the Munstermen are recorded to have expelled the Viking ruling elite. If correct, Ímar's return to power could explain the Meic Arailt kindred's actions against him. Maccus may have ransomed Ímar to the Limerickmen, or Ímar may have escaped his captors. Certainly the Annals of Inisfallen reports that Ímar "escaped over sea" the following year. In any event, Ímar next appears on record three years later when he and his two sons were slain by Brian mac Cennétig, King of Munster. In 967, Brian's brother, Mathgamain mac Cennétig, is reported to have attacked Limerick. If the eleventh- or twelfth-century Cogad Gáedel re Gallaib is to be believed, Ímar played a role in slaying Mathgamain the year before his own death at Brian's hands. As such, the Meic Arailt and Brian's family appear to have shared a common enemy in the person of Ímar.

Such lawmen appear to have been elective representatives from the Hebrides, and these annal-entries could be evidence that leading figures in the Irish Sea region received formal support from the Hebrides. Following Maccus' campaigning against Ímar, nothing is recorded of the Meic Arailt until the 980s. In 984, the Annals of Inisfallen reports that the Meic Arailt contracted an alliance with Brian's family, and exchanged hostages with them in an apparent agreement pertaining to military cooperation against the Kingdom of Dublin. This compact seems to indicate that Brian's family sought to align the Vikings of the Isles against those of Dublin.

Maccus' brother eventually resumed the Meic Arailt attacks upon the Welsh. According to the Peniarth version of Brut y Tywysogyon, a certain —a man who may be identical to Gofraid—ravaged Llŷn in 978. The Red Book of Hergest version of Brut y Tywysogyon reports that Gofraid, along with the exiled Venedotian prince Custennin ab Iago, ravaged Llŷn and Anglesey in 980. The date of Maccus' death is unknown. Since he does not appear on record again, it is possible that he was dead by this date, and that Gofraid had succeeded him in the Isles. On the other hand, the record of the Meic Arailt assisting Brian's family in 984 could be evidence that Maccus was yet still active. In any case, Maccus is certainly unrecorded after 984. Gofraid's campaigning on Anglesey suggests that whatever authority the Meic Arailt gained over the Welsh in the 970s was only temporary. The fact that there is no record of Viking activity against the island between 972 and 980 suggests that the Meic Arailt's ambitions there had been fulfilled during this span.

In 980, Amlaíb Cúarán was utterly defeated by Máel Sechnaill mac Domnaill, King of Mide at the Battle of Tara, and retired to Iona where he died soon after. Whilst Islesmen are reported to have supported Amlaíb Cúarán's cause in the conflict, the Meic Arailt are not mentioned, and there is no specific evidence that they did so. On one hand, it is possible that the family supported Amlaíb Cúarán in the conflict. On the other hand, if evidence of contemporary Orcadian encroachment into the Isles is taken into account, there is reason to suspect that the Islesmen present in the conflict were adherents of the earls of Orkney, and did not include the Meic Arailt.

Maccus' brother is the first King of the Isles to recorded as such by Irish sources, when he was styled  by the fifteenth- to sixteenth-century Annals of Ulster on his death in 989. The appearance of the kingdom at this time could indicate that the catalyst behind its emergence was Amlaíb Cúarán's defeat at Tara, the subsequent loss of Dublin to Máel Sechnaill's overlordship, and Amlaíb Cúarán's later demise. On one hand, the kingdom could have been a recent creation, perhaps a result of the Meic Arailt gaining overlordship over the Hebridean . On the other hand, the first record of a King of the Isles in Irish sources may merely reflect the fact that Dublin had been lost to the Irish after having previously formed part of Amlaíb Cúarán's imperium. In any event, later apparent descendants of Gofraid competed with the descendants of Amlaíb Cúarán for control of a kingdom that encompassed the Hebrides and the Irish Sea region.

Notes

Citations

References

Primary sources

Secondary sources

External links

10th-century rulers of the Kingdom of the Isles
10th-century Scottish people
Monarchs of the Isle of Man
Norse-Gaelic monarchs
Uí Ímair
Year of birth unknown